Yakov Beniaminovich Brand (first name often given as Jacob; May 20, 1955 – June 12, 2018) was a Russian cardiac surgeon and television presenter.

He was born on May 20, 1955 in Odessa to a Jewish family. He graduated from the Odessa State Medical Institute in 1979. Since 1981 he lived and worked in Moscow.

From 1999 to 2010 he was the host of the TV program Without Рrescription on the channel NTV. In 2001–2003 he was leading the program on drug addiction Coma on NTV, paired with musician Sergei Galanin.

Brand was hospitalized on May 30, 2018 and died on June 12, 2018.  He was 63.

Awards 
 State Prize of the Russian Federation (2001)
 Moscow Medical Award (2004)
 Honored Doctor of the Russian Federation (2005)

References

External links 
 Эфиры с участием Якова Бранда на радиостанции «Эхо Москвы»

1955 births
2018 deaths
Physicians from Odesa
Odesa Jews
Soviet surgeons
Russian cardiac surgeons
Odesa National Medical University alumni
Russian television presenters
State Prize of the Russian Federation laureates
20th-century surgeons